The Esmeraldas antbird (Sipia nigricauda) is a species of bird in the family Thamnophilidae. It is found in Colombia and Ecuador. Its natural habitats are subtropical or tropical moist lowland forests and subtropical or tropical moist montane forests.

The Esmeraldas antbird was described by the naturalists Osbert Salvin and Frederick DuCane Godman in 1892 and given the binomial name Myrmeciza nigricauda. The original description was for a female bird and this was later the source of taxonomic confusion. The male bird was considered a different species until in 1991 it was realized that the two taxa were simply the male and female forms of the same species. A molecular phylogenetic study published in 2013 found that the genus Myrmeciza, as then defined, was polyphyletic. In the resulting rearrangement to create monophyletic genera the Esmeraldas antbird was moved to a resurrected genus Sipia that had been introduced by the Austrian ornithologist Carl Eduard Hellmayr in 1924.

References

Esmeraldas antbird
Birds of the Tumbes-Chocó-Magdalena
Taxonomy articles created by Polbot
Esmeraldas antbird
Esmeraldas antbird
Esmeraldas antbird